Mahmut Çuhadar (born 1967) is a Turkish bureaucrat. He is currently serving as governor of Adıyaman and has been since 2020. He has a wife and two children.

Early life and education 
Çuhadar was born in 1967 in Bafra, Samsun; he completed his all of his education in Bafra. He graduated from Ankara University in 1988.

Career 
Çuhadar was appointed governor of Adıyaman on June 9, 2020.

Criticism 
During the 2023 Turkey–Syria earthquake, Çuhadar was met with protests from the local population because of a lack of help to the affected regions. He received more criticism after he was filmed laughing in front of the grieving people who lost their relatives in Adıyaman. The next day, he was protested again alongside the Minister of Transport and Infrastructure Adil Karaismailoğlu. Former AKP deputy Mehmet Metiner defended Çuhadar by saying: "Should he have cried instead of laughing?"

References 

Living people
1967 births
21st-century Turkish politicians

Ankara University alumni
Governors of Adıyaman